Raquel Sánchez Jiménez (born 18 November 1975) is a Spanish lawyer and politician of the Socialists' Party of Catalonia who has been serving as Minister of Transport, Mobility and Urban Agenda of the Government of Spain since July 2021, in the cabinet presided by Pedro Sánchez.

Political career
Sánchez Jiménez previously served as mayor of Gavà since 2014.

In 2022, Sánchez Jiménez led negotiations with Spain’s transport associations that resulted in a 1 billion euro ($1.10 billion) support package aimed at defusing the walkout over fuel prices that has caused sporadic goods shortages. In response, Spanish truck drivers announced in March 2022 they would continue their strike "indefinitely."

References

1975 births
Government ministers of Spain
Living people
Socialists' Party of Catalonia politicians
People from Catalonia
Public works ministers of Spain